Melanie Meier (born August 25, 1967) is a Democratic member of the Kansas House of Representatives, representing the 40th district. An officer in the United States Army Reserve, she was called up for active duty and replaced by Don Navinsky in February 2009. Once Meier's tour of duty in Iraq was complete, in January 2010, Navinsky relinquished the seat and Meier resumed her duties at the State House. She was re-elected to a second term in November 2010.

Early life and career

Meier was born in a United States Army hospital in Würzburg, Germany, where her father, who was serving as an army officer and her mother was the bookkeeper at the local Rod and Gun Club. Meier's father's career in the army took their family to many duty stations, and she attended a new school every year until she began junior high school in Leavenworth, Kansas, where her family settled after her father's retirement from the Army.

Meier graduated from Leavenworth High School in 1985 and attended the University of Saint Mary in Leavenworth for two years before transferring to the University of Kansas in 1987. While at the University of Kansas, Meier joined the Army ROTC program and was selected for active duty. She graduated from the University of Kansas in 1989 a Distinguished Military Graduate with a bachelor's degree in economics.

In 1990 Meier began active duty as an Army Air Defense artillery officer and in 1994 transferred to Military Intelligence, serving in Fort Hood, Texas; and Seoul, South Korea. As a captain in Korea, she earned her master's degree in management.

In 2004, while in Korea, Meier transferred to the Army Reserve, and as a civilian employee of the Department of Defense, she worked as a security specialist for the Special Operations Command in Korea, the U.S. Army Corps of Engineers and the Department of the Navy in Washington, DC, and the 24th Infantry Division at Fort Riley, Kansas.

As an officer in the Reserve, Meier was mobilized immediately after 9-11 for Operation Noble Eagle with the U.S. Army Corps of Engineers and reported to Fort Hamilton in New York City for initial recovery operations. Meier then spent a year on active duty with the Transatlantic Program Center, a branch of the U.S. Army Corps of Engineers that coordinates the engineer contracting in the Middle East and Africa. In 2005 Meier went on active duty again in response to Hurricanes Katrina and Rita in New Orleans as part of Task Force Unwatering, assigned to pump the water out of New Orleans, and she served as the U.S. liaison with a German task force pumping water out of the 9th Ward.

Meier was elected to the Kansas House as the 40th District Representative in the fall of 2008, but shortly after assuming her duties in the House was mobilized by the U.S. Army Reserve to serve a tour of duty in southern Iraq. Upon her return in 2010 she resumed her duties, and was re-elected to represent Kansas' 40th District in 2010.

Personal life 
Meier met her husband, Tom, while they were both lieutenants at Fort Hood, Texas, and they married in 1991 at Sacred Heart Catholic Church in Leavenworth, Kansas. They are active volunteers in the Leavenworth community; Melanie serves on the Board of the Leavenworth County Humane Society and is membership chair of the Leavenworth Historical Museum Association, and both she and Tom are active members of Veterans of Foreign Wars Post #56.

Current Legislative Committees
Melanie Meier has been a member of the following committees:
Corrections and Juvenile Justice, Member
Judiciary, Member
Veterans, Military and Homeland Security, Ranking Minority Member

Professional Experience
Malnie Meier has had the following professional experience:
Inspector General, Lieutenant Colonel, United States Army Reserve, 1989–present
Senior Military Analyst, Systems Studies and Simulations Incorporated

Organizations
Melanie Meier has been a member of the following organizations:
Membership Chairperson, Leavenworth Historical Museum Association, 2002–present
Board Member, Historical and Archaeological Society of Fort Riley, 2002-2005
Volunteer, Red Cross

External links
 Official Campaign Website
 Kansas Legislature - Melanie Meier
 Project Vote Smart profile
 Kansas Votes profile

References

1967 births
Living people
Democratic Party members of the Kansas House of Representatives
Women state legislators in Kansas
United States Army personnel of the Iraq War
Female United States Army officers
United States Army reservists
Women in the Iraq War
21st-century American women politicians
21st-century American politicians